F47 may refer to:
 , a Type 22 frigate of the Brazilian Navy
 , a Leander-class frigate of the Royal Navy
 , a Shivalik-class frigate of the Indian Navy
 Republic F-47 Thunderbolt, an American fighter aircraft